Stephen 'Picky' Maher (born 17 January 1993) is an Irish hurler who plays as a right wing-forward for the Laois senior team.

Born in Ballacolla, County Laois, Maher first played competitive hurling in the various juvenile grades. He arrived on the inter-county scene when he first linked up with the Laois minor team, before later lining out with the under-21 side. He made his senior debut in the 2012 National Hurling League. Maher has been a regular fixture on team since that initial appearance, and has won one National Hurling League (Division 2A) medal.

At club level Maher is a one-time championship medallist with Clough–Ballacolla.

Career statistics

Honours
Clough–Ballacolla
Laois Senior Hurling Championship (1): 2011

Laois
National Hurling League, Division 2A (1): 2013

References

1993 births
Living people
Clough-Ballacolla hurlers
Laois inter-county hurlers